Negro Foot is an unincorporated community in Hanover County, Virginia.  The community's unusual name has attracted the attention of media commentators.

The origin of the name is obscure. Some say the community was named from an incident when a slave's foot was amputated to prevent another escape, while others believe an act of cannibalism caused the name to be selected. The name "Nigger Foot" appears in older publications. A variant name is "Negro".

References

Unincorporated communities in Hanover County, Virginia
Unincorporated communities in Virginia